Noroeste de Minas is one of the twelve mesoregions of the Brazilian state of Minas Gerais. It is composed of 19 municipalities distributed across 2 microregions.

References 

Noroeste de Minas